is a Japanese manufacturer of railroad vehicles based in Osaka. It is an affiliate company of Kintetsu Corporation. In business since 1920 as Tanaka Rolling Stock Works, and renamed The Kinki Sharyo Co., Ltd in 1945, they have produced light rail vehicles used by a number of transportation agencies, especially in the United States.

Clients

North America 

 Boston's MBTA Green Line
 LA's Metro A, E, L, K, and C lines.
 New Jersey's Hudson-Bergen and Newark Light Rail systems
 San Jose's VTA Light Rail
 Phoenix's Valley Metro Rail
 Seattle's Sound Transit Central Link Light Rail
 Dallas Area Rapid Transit (DART) light rail Dallas, Texas (Kinki Sharyo SLRV)

Japan
 JR Group
 Kintetsu
 Hanshin Electric Railway
 Nankai Electric Railway
 Osaka Municipal Transportation Bureau
 Sendai City Transportation Bureau

Asia

 Dubai, UAE's Dubai Metro
 Hong Kong's Kowloon–Canton Railway (merged with Mass Transit Railway in 2007.)
 Premium Class T1 and T2 bi-level coaches for Guangdong Through Train, also known as KTT.
Extra SP1000/1950 carriages for the Sha Tin to Central Link, ordered 2014.
 Philippine's Light Rail Transit Authority 
Class 1200 LRV (jointly with Nippon Sharyo) serving the Manila Light Rail Transit System Line 1.
 Qatar, Doha Metro
 Singapore's Mass Rapid Transit system

Elsewhere 
 Cairo Metro
 Qatar Rail, Qatar
 Trans-Australian Express train coaches.
 Alexandria, Egypt trams
 Argentina: Operadora Ferroviaria Sociedad del Estado Roca Line
 Ferrocarriles Nacionales de México

Products 
Kinki Sharyo also produces steel doors, known as the KJ series, for public housing in Japan.

 LRTA Line 1 Manila, Philippines
 LRTA Class 1200
 Railway Transportation in the United States
Unnamed Low Floor LRV – Santa Clara County, California
 Green Line (MBTA) Type 7 Light Rail Vehicle – Boston, Massachusetts
 HB Series (informal name) low-floor light rail vehicle – Hudson-Bergen Light Rail Newark & Hudson County, New Jersey
 Super LRV (semi-formal name for rebuilt product) – Dallas, Texas
 Kinkisharyo-Mitsui LF LRV – Sound Transit Link light rail, Seattle, Washington
 Valley Metro Rail LF LRV – Phoenix, Arizona (entered service 2008)
 LFX-300 – marketed as AmeriTRAM™ and tested on Charlotte Area Transit System network in 2011.
 P3010 – LA Metro, Los Angeles, California
 Life Extension work on Hitachi Rail CQ311 series cars used by MARTA
 Cairo Metro
 M, N1 and N2 Cars for No.1 Line
 M, N1,N2 and T Cars for No.2 Line
 KCR in Hong Kong (merged with MTR in 2007)
 EMU SP1900/SP1950
 KTT passenger coaches for Guangdong Through Train
 T1 Premium Class bi-level Coaches
 T2 First Class bi-level Coaches
 Ferrocarriles Argentinos
 Sub-urban "Toshiba" EMUs of Buenos Aires, Argentina (with Toshiba's electrical equipments)
 For Sarmiento Line
 For Mitre Line
 For Urquiza Line
 For Roca Line
 JR Group
 Shinkansen (West Japan Railway)
 W7 Series Shinkansen
 N700 Series Shinkansen
 700 Series (Rail-Star) Shinkansen
 500 Series Shinkansen
 100 Series (Grand Hikari) Shinkansen
 Shinkansen (Central Japan Railway)
 300 Series Shinkansen
 100 Series Shinkansen
 Shinkansen (Kyushu Railway)
 N700 Series Shinkansen
 JR Central
 313 series – Central Japan Railway Suburban Electric Train
 JR East
 E257 series – East Japan Railway Limited Express
 JR West
 223 series – West Japan Railway Suburban Electric Train
 225 series – West Japan Railway Suburban Electric Train
 227 series – West Japan Railway Suburban Electric Train
 271 series – West Japan Railway limited express train
 287 series – West Japan Railway limited express train
 285 series – West Japan Railway and Central Japan Railway Electric Sleeping car
 321 series – West Japan Railway Commuter Electric Train
 323 series – West Japan Railway Commuter Electric Train
 681 series – West Japan Railway Company and Hokuetsu Express Limited Express
 683 series – West Japan Railway Limited Express
 87 series (KiITe 87, KiSaINe 86-501, KiRa 86, KiShi 86) – West Japan Railway Diesel Sleeping car
 JR Shikoku
 7000 series – Shikoku Railway Suburban Electric Train
 1500 series – Shikoku Railway Diesel Train
 JR Kyushu
 303 series – Kyushu Railway Commuter Electric Train
 813 series – Kyushu Railway Suburban Electric Train
 Private Railways in Japan
 Kintetsu Railway
 Double decker cars "Vista Car" – Kintetsu
 21020 series – Limited Express Electric Train "Urban Liner Next"
 23000 series – Limited Express Electric Train "Ise-Shima Liner"
 22600 series/16600 Series – Limited Express Electric Train "Ace"
 50000 series – Limited Express Electric Train "Shimakaze"
 3220, 5820, 6820, 9020 and 9820 Series – "Series 21" Commuter Electric Car
 Hanshin Electric Railway
 1000 series – Commuter Train
 5700 series – Commuter Train
 Nankai Electric Railway
 8300 series – Commuter Train
 Kita-Osaka Kyuko Railway
 9000 series – Electric Train
 Municipal Railways in Japan
 Kyoto Municipal Transportation Bureau
 10 series – Subway train for the Karasuma Line
 20 series – Subway train for the Karasuma Line
 50 series – Subway train for the Tozai Line
 Osaka Municipal Transportation Bureau / Osaka Metro
 22 series – Subway Cars
 80 series – Linear Motor Subway Cars for Imazatosuji Line
 30000 series – Subway Cars for Tanimachi Line and Midosuji Line
 Tokyo Metropolitan Bureau of Transportation
 5300 series – Subway Cars for the Toei Asakusa Line
 Tokyo Metro
 05 series – Tokyo Metro for Tozai Line and Chiyoda Line (Ayase Branch)
 Hiroshima Electric Railway
 LF LRV 5100 series
 Sendai City Transportation Bureau
 2000 series – Sendai Subway for Tozai Line
 Fukuoka Municipal Transportation Bureau
 2000 series – Stainless Steel Electric Train
 Prototype(s)
 Smart BEST hybrid Battery electric multiple unit

See also 
 Kinki Sharyo SLRV

References

External links 
Kinki Sharyo 
Kinki Sharyo USA

Companies based in Osaka Prefecture
Vehicle manufacturing companies established in 1920
Electric vehicle manufacturers of Japan
Defunct defense companies of Japan
Tram manufacturers
Rail infrastructure manufacturers
Rolling stock manufacturers of Japan
Japanese brands
Companies listed on the Tokyo Stock Exchange
1920 establishments in Japan
Kintetsu Group Holdings